The King's Mail (Spanish:Correo del rey) is a 1951 Spanish historical adventure film directed by Ricardo Gascón and starring Cesare Danova, Juana Soler and Isabel de Pomés. It was made at the Orphea Studios in Barcelona.

Cast

References

Bibliography 
  Eva Woods Peiró. White Gypsies: Race and Stardom in Spanish Musical Films. U of Minnesota Press, 2012.

External links 
 

1950s historical adventure films
Spanish historical adventure films
1951 films
1950s Spanish-language films
Films directed by Ricardo Gascón
Napoleonic Wars films
Films with screenplays by Rafael J. Salvia
Spanish black-and-white films
1950s Spanish films